Divine Office may refer to:

 Liturgy of the Hours, the recitation of certain Christian prayers at fixed hours according to the discipline of the Roman Catholic Church
 Canonical hours, the recitation of such prayers in Christianity more generally
 Worship services, such as Matins and Vespers

See also
 Divine Service (disambiguation)
 Divine Worship (disambiguation)